Discovery+ (pronounced "Discovery Plus"; stylized as discovery+) is an American streaming service owned by Warner Bros. Discovery (WBD). The service focuses on factual programming drawn from the libraries of Discovery's main channel brands, as well as original series (including spin-offs of programs from Discovery's networks), and other acquired content.

It was first launched in India on March 23, 2020. It launched in the United States on January 4, 2021, and replaced Discovery's Dplay and Eurosport Player services in Europe the next day.  Discovery+ has 24 million subscribers.

Discovery+ became a sister service to WarnerMedia's HBO Max following their merger in April 2022. WBD had announced plans for Discovery+ and HBO Max to be replaced by a new service drawn from its predecessors' libraries, although it was later revealed in February 2023 that WBD planned to maintain Discovery+ alongside the new enlarged service as part of an amended streaming strategy. The new streaming service is set to be unveiled on April 12, 2023.

History
Discovery first launched Discovery+ in India on March 23, 2020, and included content from Discovery's various brands. In September of the same year, Discovery announced plans to launch an international version of Discovery+ in early 2021.

In October 2020, it was announced that Dplay would be renamed Discovery+ in the United Kingdom and Ireland in the following month.

On January 4, 2021, Discovery+ launched in the U.S. with both a paid ad-supported plan and an ad-free plan. On January 5, 2021, Discovery+ launched in eight European territories, subsuming Dplay and the Eurosport Player services. 

In an earnings call on November 3, 2021, president and CEO of Discovery Streaming and International JB Perrette discussed potential options for the service following the then-proposed spin-off and merger of WarnerMedia into Discovery to form Warner Bros. Discovery. These involved a bundling and/or eventual merger of Discovery+ with WarnerMedia's streaming service HBO Max, and offering such a merged service in markets where Discovery+ has yet to launch, such as other parts of the Asia-Pacific region. On March 14, 2022, after Discovery shareholders approved the merger, CFO Gunnar Wiedenfels stated that the merged company planned to pursue a merger of HBO Max with Discovery+ as a long-term goal, following the process proposed by Perrette earlier.

In August 2022, Perrette announced that the merged service would launch in the United States "next summer", if not sooner, followed by Latin America in late-2023, HBO Max's European markets in early-2024, and additional Asia-Pacific and European markets. Perrette stated that HBO Max and Discovery+ had complimentary scopes targeting "appointment viewing" and "comfort viewing" respectively, and thus described the unified service as being "an unprecedented combination in an already crowded market." In November 2022, it was announced that the new service would now launch in spring 2023. In early-December 2022, it was reported by CNBC via inside sources that the unified platform was being developed under the codename "BEAM", and that multiple names were being considered—including simply "Max". The service is scheduled to be unveiled during an event on April 12, 2023. Following the merger, selected Discovery library programs had begun to appear on HBO Max. 

In February 2023, Zaslav stated during an earnings call that WBD no longer planned to shut down Discovery+ in favor of the merged service, due to its profitability and low churn. He explained that its customers were "very happy with the product offering", and asked, "why would we shut that off?". The Wall Street Journal had reported earlier in the month that WBD had planned to keep Discovery+ to provide a lower-cost compliment to the new service, which was expected to have a higher price than HBO Max, and would feature "most", but not all, of the content of Discovery+.

Programming

Original programming 

Original programming carried by Discovery+ includes spin-offs of programs from Warner Bros. Discovery's factual networks.

Content library 
The library of Discovery+ is drawn primarily from the original programming of Warner Bros. Discovery's factual channel brands, including but not limited to Discovery Channel, Animal Planet, TLC, Travel Channel, Magnolia Network, HGTV, Food Network, Investigation Discovery, CNN, and other international brands where applicable such as Asian Food Network.

In the U.S., Discovery+ has also licensed non-scripted programming from A&E Networks—including A&E, History, and Lifetime programs—and NBCUniversal Global Distribution—including American Ninja Warrior, The Biggest Loser, Flipping Out, Queer Eye, The Real Housewives of Melbourne, Cheshire, Johannesburg, Top Chef Canada (which is produced for the Canadian version of Food Network), and WAGS. 

On August 4, 2022, WBD announced that a CNN content hub featuring a selection of its original series and documentaries would be added to the service. CNN had attempted to launch a streaming service, CNN+, during the lead-up to the WarnerMedia/Discovery merger, but it was discontinued by Perrette and new CNN head Chris Licht only a month after its launch due to its conflicts with the merged company's OTT strategy.

Sports 
In selected European territories, Discovery+ offers sports content via Warner Bros. Discovery's Eurosport networks, subsuming Eurosport's previous streaming platform Eurosport Player. The service began to subsume GolfTV following its December 2022 shutdown.

Device support and service features
Discovery+ is available through traditional Windows/macOS web browsers, the major digital media player platforms (such as Amazon Fire TV, Roku, Apple TV and Chromecast), Android TV, Xbox One/Series X/S gaming consoles, and through Android and iOS apps.

Launch 

In October 2021, Discovery announced that Discovery+ would launch in Canada on October 19. Corus Entertainment (which is the Canadian licensee for most of Discovery's lifestyle brands) is a marketing partner for the service, and has promoted Discovery+ via its television networks, digital platforms, and radio. Discovery stated that over a thousand episodes of programming would be available with French-language subtitles at launch.

It is planned that Discovery+ will be available on Sky Glass, Sky Q and Sky X in Austria and Germany and to Vodafone customers in Romania, Portugal, Greece, Czech Republic, Hungary and Iceland by mid-2022.

In May 2022, it was announced that BT Group would become a distribution partner for the service in the UK, as part of a planned joint venture between Eurosport and BT Sport.

In August, Brazilian website vcfaz.tv has said that Discovery+ will launch in Brazil on September 1, but Discovery has denied this. It was then confirmed by Discovery that Discovery+'s launch date in Brazil would be November 9, 2021.

Criticism
There was criticism of the service at launch by some viewers of the networks and industry analysts, especially concerns that existing Discovery programming is being taken away from cable and satellite viewers and is being placed behind an additional paywall that may be inaccessible to viewers without robust broadband plans, or are in rural areas with little access to broadband, which in turn may imperil future carriage of those channels by Discovery's provider partners. Other viewers have criticized Discovery's bait-and-switch tactics in forcing them to sign up for Discovery+ to have the 'full experience' of a series, as is being done for various Discovery+ spin-offs of 90 Day Fiancé, along with obtrusive Discovery+ advertising throughout the broadcast day (including a lower third sized banner in the top-right corner during actual programming) of many Discovery networks.

See also 
 Joyn
 List of streaming media services

References

External links 
 

Warner Bros. Discovery brands
Subscription video on demand services
Internet television streaming services
Internet properties established in 2021